Detainees held at the US-run Guantanamo Bay detention camp are typically issued one of two uniforms, either a white jumpsuit if the prisoner has been labeled "compliant", or an orange jumpsuit if the detainee has been labeled "non-compliant".

When the detainees face Combatant Status Review Tribunals or Administrative Review Board hearings, they were frequently asked to explain their uniforms to the overseeing officer, and they were considered a point in favor of further detaining or releasing the prisoner.

Once insurgents began capturing foreigners in Iraq, there was a tendency to dress them in the same orange jumpsuits as their own forces were being dressed in when delivered to Guantanamo Bay – considered by some to be a sign of the insurgents "equating" the captures.

On March 16, 2006, Secretary of State legal adviser John B. Bellinger III gave a digital press conference in which he dismissed the view that all the prisoners were being held in orange jumpsuits, stating "Very few people wear orange jump suits anymore, and yet that is the image that is being left with people all around the world, that everybody in Guantanamo is wearing an orange jump suit."

A number of protests against the prison camp have seen activists dress in the iconic orange jumpsuits to draw attention to the issue. In May 2006, a Turkish judge barred Loai al-Saqa, a suspected terrorist, from being brought into his own trial, because he chose to wear an orange jumpsuit for the hearing, demonstrative of his solidarity with those in Guantanamo, and his intentions to protest or resist legal authority.

In his testimony during his 2006 Administrative Review Board hearing, Khirullah Khairkhwa described being issued a black uniform when guards (falsely) came to believe he was contemplating suicide.

McClatchy report
On June 15, 2008, the McClatchy News Service published a package of articles about Guantanamo.  In a profile of Zia Khalid Najib they quoted
Abdul Jabar Sabit, Attorney General of Afghanistan. According to their report "...he was struck that detainees were classified into groups, marked in descending order from orange to white garb, by how well they behaved and not by whether they were suspected of terrorist or anti-American activities. ... This division did not have anything to do with the crimes attributed to them. Only their behavior in the prison was taken into account." According to the McClatchy package, some of the detainees with the most meaningful ties to terrorism had been released early, because they were compliant with the camp rules, while low-level or innocent men remained in detention because they had personality clashes with their guards.

References

Uniforms
Guantanamo Bay captives legal and administrative procedures